"Stand in Your Love" is a single released by Bethel Music and Josh Baldwin on August 10, 2018, being the lead single for Bethel Music's eleventh live album, Victory (2019). The song also appeared on the album Bethel Music en Español (2019). The song was written by Ethan Hulse, Josh Baldwin, Mark Harris and Rita Springer. Ed Cash handled the production of the single. It became Baldwin's first entry on Billboard's US Christian Songs chart, peaking at No. 7.

Background
Caleb Parke of Fox News first reported in an article that "Stand in Your Love" would be released by Josh Baldwin in July 2018. A live performance video of Josh Baldwin singing the song at Heaven Come Conference 2018 was published on YouTube by Bethel Music in July 2018. Bethel Music then released the radio-adapted version of "Stand in Your Love" on August 10, 2018 in digital format. The song impacted Christian radio in the United States on August 17, 2018.

Writing and development
Josh Baldwin had an interview with Kevin Davis, lead contributor at NewReleaseToday about the song and the inspiration behind it. Davis asked about the personal story behind the song, to which Baldwin responded, saying:
The song kind of came out of nowhere for me. I hadn't been doing too much songwriting at the time as I had just released my album The War Is Over, and wasn't in a season of thinking much about new songs. I was in Dallas, Texas on a trip and I ended up staying an extra day and stayed with Rita Springer and Mark Harris at Gateway Church. I was hanging out and they were writing songs for their Gateway album and I ended up staying and writing this song with them. Another guy named Ethan Hulse from Nashville who I had just met that day came in to tell us he was leaving and told us he had this song idea and the chorus. I was blown away and knew we needed to jump on it. He had about 45 minutes before he had to leave and we finished the song from there.

 – Josh Baldwin, NewReleaseToday

Music videos
The live music video of "Stand in Your Love" as sung by Josh Baldwin at the Verizon Theater at Grand Prairie during Heaven Come Conference 2018 was published on Bethel Music's YouTube channel on July 19, 2018. On January 25, 2019, Bethel Music released the official lyric video of the song's album version on YouTube.

Accolades

Track listing

Charts

Weekly charts

Year-end charts

Certifications

Release history

References

External links
  on PraiseCharts
  on PraiseCharts
 

2018 singles
2018 songs
Bethel Music songs
Songs written by Ethan Hulse